Moretus is a lunar impact crater located in the heavily cratered highland region near the south pole of the Moon.

South of Moretus, the crater Short is located, while to the north is Cysatus. To the northwest lies Gruemberger, and Curtius is located to the northeast. Due to the location near the lunar limb, the crater appears oblong because of foreshortening.  The crater is named after the 17th-century Flemish mathematician and geometer Theodorus Moretus.

The rim of the crater has a wide, terraced inner wall, and a complex outer rampart. The floor has been partly resurfaced and is relatively flat. In the middle is a central mountain formation that rises about 2.1 kilometers above the surrounding floor.

Satellite craters 
By convention these features are identified on lunar maps by placing the letter on the side of the crater midpoint that is closest to Moretus.

References 

 
 
 
 
 
 
 
 
 
 
 
 

Impact craters on the Moon